The commune of Bwambarangwe is a commune of Kirundo Province in northern Burundi. The capital lies at Bwambarangwe.

References

Communes of Burundi
Kirundo Province